Transdanubian may refer to:

 relative term, designating someone or something related to any region beyond the Danube river (lat. trans- / beyond, over), depending on a point of observation
 Transdanubian Bulgaria, historical designation for regions under former Bulgarian rule to the north from the Danube river
 Transdanubian Hungary, designation for Hungarian regions to the west of the Danube river
 Transdanubian Mountains (Hungary), mountains in Transdanubian regions of Hungary
 Battle of the Transdanubian Hills, a World War II battle (1945) fought in Transdanubian regions of Hungary
 Transdanubian Romania, designation for Romanian regions to the east of the Danube river (North Dobruja)
 Transdanubian Serbia, designation for Serbian regions to the north of the Danube river (Serbian Banat and Serbian Bačka)
 Transdanubian Vienna (Transdanubien in Viennese German), designation for Vienna city districts to the northeast of the Danube river (Donaustadt and Floridsdorf)
 Transdanubian sand viper, a viper species, endemic to some Danubian regions of Bulgaria and Romania

See also
 Danube (disambiguation)